Samuel Henry Miller (June 26, 1921 – March 7, 2019) was an American businessman and philanthropist who propelled the growth of Forest City Material Co. from lumber to real-estate which became Forest City Enterprises. He was the first Jew to receive an Archbishop Edward F. Hoban Award for service to the Catholic Church.

Early life and education
Miller's father emigrated from Russia to Ellis Island where an Irish immigrant taking names allegedly gave him the surname of Miller. Miller earned a Bachelor of Arts degree from Western Reserve University in 1941 and a Master of Business Administration from Harvard Business School in 1943.

Military service
Miller served in World War II as a lieutenant.

Awards 
Miller was presented received a Lifetime Achievement Award from the Cleveland Diocese in 2015. He was presented the Lifetime Achievement Award at the Cleveland Jewish News on November 20, 2016 at Landerhaven.

Personal life
After serving in World War II, Miller met his future wife, Ruth Ratner (December 1, 1925 – November 26, 1996), in Wickliffe, Ohio, in 1946 at Leonard Ratner's summer cottage. Ruth was the daughter of Forest City Material Co. co-founder Leonard Ratner and sister of Albert Ratner; they married later that same year. Together, they had four children: Aaron David Miller, Richard Miller, Gabrielle Miller, and Abraham Miller. Miller divorced Ratner in 1983 and she remarried Rabbi Phillip Horowitz (1922 – 2002). He married Maria Shanley in 1983. Shanley converted from Roman Catholicism to Judaism upon marrying Miller. In 1996, his first wife, Ruth, died from cancer. Miller had surgery in 2002 to treat bladder cancer. He died on March 7, 2019. Services were held at the Park Synagogue in Shaker Heights, Ohio and his interment was at Bet Olam Cemetery.

See also
 Jews and Judaism in Greater Cleveland

References

Citations

Sources

External links
 Cleveland Clinic profile: Samuel H. Miller
 Profile: Samuel H. Miller on Bloomberg News
 Obituary of Samuel Henry Miller
 

1921 births
2019 deaths
20th-century American businesspeople
21st-century American businesspeople
American people of Russian-Jewish descent
American people of Polish-Jewish descent
United States Navy personnel of World War II
Businesspeople from Cleveland
Military personnel from Cleveland
United States Navy officers
20th-century American naval officers
Case Western Reserve University alumni
Harvard Business School alumni
American chief executives
Philanthropists from Ohio
American real estate businesspeople
20th-century American Jews
Ratner family
20th-century American philanthropists
21st-century American Jews